Pseudorhaphitoma ethekwini is a small sea snail, a marine gastropod mollusk in the family Mangeliidae.

Description
The length of the shell varies between 6 mm and 7.5 mm.

Distribution
This marine genus occurs off Durban Bay, South Africa and Southern Mozambique.

References

 R.N. Kilburn, Turridae (Mollusca: Gastropoda) of southern Africa and Mozambique. Part 7. Subfamily Mangeliinae, section 2; Annals of the Natal Museum 34, pp 317 - 367 (1993)

External links
 
 

ethekwini
Gastropods described in 1993